Love Thy Woman is a 2020 Philippine drama television series broadcast by Kapamilya Channel. The series premiered on ABS-CBN's Kapamilya Gold afternoon block and worldwide via The Filipino Channel from February 10 to September 11, 2020, replacing Kadenang Ginto.

Series overview

Episodes

Season 1
<onlyinclude>

Notes

References

Lists of Philippine drama television series episodes